6.1 is the sixth studio album by Out of the Grey, released on August 15, 2001. It was their first (and only) on Rocketown Records, after leaving Sparrow.

The duo saw the new album as an opportunity to redefine themselves as a band, and this hope is reflected in the album's name, 6.1. In an interview, the Dentés said "This time around, we were told to forget about the mentality of trying to write a certain way. It's been a long time since we've been able to let go and feel the freedom to do what we like and be what we want to be."

Although the album gained favorable reviews, it would be their last as a band until 2015.

Track listing 
All songs written by Christine and Scott Denté, except where noted.

"Shine Like Crazy" – 4:31
"Truth Breaks Through" (Monroe  Jones) – 3:53
"Brave" – 3:07
"What's It Gonna Be" – 3:08
"With All My Heart" – 3:06
"Waiting" – 3:07
"Tell Your Story" – 3:33
"Out of the Ordinary" (Chris Donohue, Ken Lewis) – 3:54
"The Words" – 2:57
"I Want Everything" – 3:56
"Grace, Mercy and Peace" – 7:28
source:

Personnel 

Out of the Grey
 Christine Denté – vocals 
 Scott Denté – guitars, vocals 

Additional personnel
 Jeff Roach – keyboards, drums 
 Gary Burnette – guitars 
 Mark Hill – bass 
 Greg Herrington – drums 
 Dan Needham – drums 
 Ken Lewis – percussion 

Production
 Monroe Jones – producer 
 Don Donahue – executive producer 
 Jim Dineen – engineer at The Bennett House, Dark Horse Recording and Screaming Baby, Franklin, Tennessee; Rack N Roll, Nashville, Tennessee
 David Streit – assistant engineer 
 Tom Laune – mixing at Bridgeway Studios, Nashville, Tennessee
 Hank Williams – mastering at MasterMix, Nashville, Tennessee
 Jamie Kiner – production coordinator 
 Jimmy Abegg – image coordinator, photography 
 Karrine Caulkins – art direction 
 Linda Bourdeaux – design 
 Fleming McWilliams – stylist
 Robin Geary – hair stylist, make-up

Notes
 According to the liner notes, the album was dedicated to Vincent Denté (1937-1999).
 An instrumental interlude appears at the end of "With All My Heart", starting at 2:43. This is a shorter version of the hidden track at the end of "With All My Heart".

References

Out of the Grey albums
2001 albums